The Sherwood Point lighthouse is a lighthouse located near Idlewild in Door County, Wisconsin, United States.

Situated on the west side of the north entrance to Sturgeon Bay, it was listed in the National Register of Historic Places in 1984.

Further reading
 Havighurst, Walter. The Long Ships Passing: The Story of the Great Lakes. Macmillan, 1943.
 Oleszewski, Wes, Great Lakes Lighthouses, American and Canadian: A Comprehensive Directory/Guide to Great Lakes Lighthouses. Gwinn, MI: Avery Color Studios, 1998. .
 Sapulski, Wayne S. Lighthouses of Lake Michigan: Past and Present. Fowlerville, MI: Wilderness Adventure Books, 2001. .
 Wright, Larry and Patricia, Great Lakes Lighthouses Encyclopedia. Erin: Boston Mills Press, 2006. .

References

External links

Sherwood Point Lighthouse, Door County Maritime Museum
Pepper, Terry, Seeing the light, Sherwood Point Light Station (Archived May 9, 2021)
Lighthouse friends article
NPS Inventory of Historic Light Stations - Wisconsin (Archived October 9, 2012)
 

Historic American Engineering Record in Wisconsin
Lighthouses completed in 1883
Lighthouses in Door County, Wisconsin
Lighthouses on the National Register of Historic Places in Wisconsin
National Register of Historic Places in Door County, Wisconsin